The PSA Group (Peugeot/Citroën) sells a variety of automobile engines. Later HDi engines are built as part of a joint-venture with Ford Motor Company.

DJ/DK

The DJ/DK is a family of inline-four diesel engines derived from the 2.1-liter XUD engine. The DJ engines were for installation in commercial vehicles, while the DKs were for passenger cars.
 DK5 — 2.5 L (2,446 cc) turbo

Douvrin

The Douvrin family, formally called ZDJ/ZEJ, or "J6R/J7T", was a family of all-aluminum inline-four petrol and diesel engines made in a joint-venture between Peugeot, Renault and Volvo in the 1970s through the 1990s. * Volvo used in the 2.0L version in the 440BK. ** AMC Eagle also fitted version with a BENDIX ECU to the '88-'89 Eagle Medallion, 2.0L. 

 2.0 (ZEJ)/J6R — 2.0 L (1995 cc)
 2.2 (ZDJ/J7T) — 2.2 L (2165 cc)
 2.1 (J8R/J8S) diesel and turbo-diesel — 2.1L (2068 cc)

NOTE: Although not commonly referred to as a "Douvrin;" the larger 6 Cyl engine was also built in the Peugeot factory in Douvrin, France... this version was used far longer by Volvo that the other mfrs and is commonly referred to as a "PRV" -Peugeot, Renault, Volvo. The famous DeLorean DMC-12, Eagle Premier, early 1990s Dodge Monaco, Renault Alpine, as well as the Peugeot 505/604 all were fitted with the "PRV."

DT

The DT is a family of diesel V6 engines shared between the PSA Group,  Jaguar Land Rover and Ford Motor Company (where it is called AJD-V6). 

DT17 — 2.7 L (2,720 cc)
DT20 — 3.0 L (2,993 cc)

DV

The DV is a family of diesel inline-four engines shared between the PSA Group, Mazda Motor Corporation (where it is called MZ-CD or CiTD) and Ford Motor Company (where it is called DLD).

 DV4 — 1.4 L (1,399 cc)
 DV5 — 1.5 L (1,499 cc)
 DV6 — 1.6 L (1,560 cc)

EB

The EB is a family of inline-three petrol engines. EB is also known commercially as PureTech engine:
EB0 — 1.0 L (999 cc) Euro 5 50 kW (68 hp) (Used in early Peugeot 208 I)
EB2FA — 1.2 L (1,199 cc) Euro 6 55 kW (75 hp) @ 5750 rpm, 118 Nm @ 2750 rpm (Used in Opel Corsa, Opel Crossland X)
EB2F — 1.2 L (1,199 cc) Euro 6 61 kW (82 hp 2017-2020) (83 hp 2020-present) (Used in Citroen C1 II (2014-2018), Citroën C3 III)
EB2ADTD — 1.2 L (1,199 cc) turbo Euro 6 74 kW (100 hp) @ 5500 rpm, 205 Nm @ 1750 rpm (Used in Opel Corsa)
EB2DT / EB2ADT — 1.2 L (1,199 cc) turbo Euro 6 81 kW (110 hp) @ 5500 rpm, 205 Nm @ 1750 rpm (Used in Citroën C3 III,  Opel Combo, Opel Crossland X)
EB2DTS — 1.2 L (1,199 cc) turbo Euro 6 96 kW (130 hp) @ 5500 rpm, 230 Nm @ 1750 rpm (Used in Opel Corsa, Opel Grandland X, Peugeot 308 II)
EB2ADTS — 1.2 L (1,199 cc) turbo Euro 6 100 kW (136 hp) @ 5500 rpm, 231 Nm @ 1750 rpm (Used in Opel Combo, MPM Erelis)
EB2ADTX — 1.2 L (1,199 cc) turbo Euro 6 115 kW (155 hp) @ 5500 rpm, 240 Nm @ 1750 rpm (Used in Peugeot 2008 GT, Citroën C4 (2020), Jeep Avenger)

Applications:
Citroën Berlingo III/Peugeot Rifter/Toyota ProAce City
Citroën C1 II (2014-2018)
Citroën C3 III
Citroën C3/C4 Aircross
Citroën C3-XR
Citroën C4 Cactus
Citroën C4 Picasso
Citroën C5 Aircross
DS 3
DS 3 Crossback
DS 4S
DS 7 Crossback
Jeep Avenger
MPM Erelis
Opel/Vauxhall Combo E
Opel/Vauxhall Corsa F
Opel/Vauxhall Crossland (known until 2020 as the Opel/Vauxhall Crossland X)
Opel/Vauxhall Grandland (known until 2021 as the Opel/Vauxhall Grandland X)
Opel/Vauxhall Mokka
Peugeot 108
Peugeot 208
Peugeot 2008
Peugeot 301
Peugeot 308 II
Peugeot 408 II
Peugeot 3008
Peugeot 5008
Toyota Aygo

The 2019 facelift of the Opel/Vauxhall Astra K included a new 1.2 3-cylinder turbo with 110, 130 or 145 hp but this isn't the PSA PureTech engine. This engine is part of GM’s E-Turbo range and was already developed at great cost by GM for the 2019 Astra before PSA purchased the company. An all-new Astra, based on a PSA platform and using PSA engines was released in 2021.

EC

The EC family of small inline-four piston engines are largely based on its predecessor, the TU family, for China, North Africa and Latin America. They are appeared in 2012 and used in cars such as Peugeot 301 and Citroën C-Elysée. 

 EC5 — 1.6 L .
 EC8 — 1.8 L .

ES

The ES family is a 60° DOHC 24 valve V6 petrol engine. It replaced the PRV engine in 1997.

 ES9 —

EW/DW

The EW/DW is a family of inline-four petrol and diesel engines:
 EW7 — 1.8 L (1,749 cc)
 EW10 — 2.0 L (1,997 cc)
 EW12 — 2.2 L (2,231 cc)
 DW8 — 1.9 L (1,868 cc)
 DW10 — 2.0 L (1,997 cc) turbo
 DW12 — 2.2 L (2,179 cc) turbo

Prince

The Prince engine is a family of inline-four 16-valve all-aluminium petrol engines with variable valve lift and variable valve timing developed by PSA Peugeot Citroën and BMW. It replaced a part of the TU line (the other part was later replaced by the EB engine) and both the ES and EW lines.

Engines:
 EP3 — 1.4 L (1,397 cc) Euro 4 70-72 kW
 EP3C — 1.4 L (1,397 cc) Euro 5 70-72 kW
 EP6 — 1.6 L (1,598 cc) Euro 4 72-88 kW
 EP6C — 1.6 L (1,598 cc) Euro 5 72-88 kW
 EP6DT — 1.6 L (1,598 cc) Euro 4 103-120 kW
 EP6CDT — 1.6 L (1,598 cc) Euro 5 103-120 kW
 EP6DTS — 1.6 L (1,598 cc) Euro 4 128-152 kW
 EP6CDTS — 1.6 L (1,598 cc) Euro 5 135 kW
 EP6CDTX — 1.6 L (1,598 cc) Euro 5 147-150 kW
 EP6FDTR — 1.6 L (1,598 cc) Euro 6 200 kW
 EP6FADTX — 1.6 L (1,598 cc) Euro 6.2 164 kW
 EP6FADTR — 1.6 L (1,598 cc) Euro 6.2 199 kW

PRV

The PRV was a shared 90° SOHC V6 engine, with later SOHC 24-valve and turbocharged additions. The PRV was shared between Peugeot, Renault, and Volvo Cars, thus the "PRV" name.  It was produced from 1974 until it was phased out in favor of the PSA ES engine in 1998. PSA codenamed it the Z series internally.

 ZM — 2.7 L (2,664 cc)
 ZN — 2.9 L (2,849 cc)
 ZP — 3.0 L (2,975 cc)

TM/TN
The TM and TN was a family of inline-four petrol engines used in the Peugeot 202, 203 and 403:

TMD
The TMD was a family of inline-four Diesel engines produced by Indenor used in the Peugeot 403 and J9:

TU

The TU is a family of inline-four petrol engines of varying displacements:

 TU9 — 1.0 L (954 cc)
 TU1 — 1.1 L (1,124 cc)
 TU2 — 1.3 L (1,294 cc)
 TU3 — 1.4 L (1,361 cc)
 TU4 — 1.5 L
 TU5 — 1.6 L (1,587 cc)

TUD

The TUD is a family of inline-four Diesel engines:

 TUD3 — 1.4 L (1,360 cc)
 TUD5 — 1.5 L (1,527 cc)

X

The X family was a line of SOHC inline-four petrol engines used by PSA and Renault for supermini cars, notable for its integral transmission design (which lent it its common nickname the "suitcase engine"), and that it was designed for near horizontal installation.  It was produced from 1972 through 1988, when it was replaced by the PSA TU engine.

 XV — 1.0 L (954 cc)
 XW — 1.1 L (1,124 cc)
 XZ — 1.2 L (1,219 cc)
 XY — 1.4 L (1,361 cc)

XB

The XB is a family of inline-four petrol engines:
 XB2 — 1.5 L (1,468 cc)
 XB5 — 1.5 L (1,468 cc)

XC

The XC was a family of inline-four petrol engines primarily used in the Peugeot 404:

XD

The XD was a family of inline-four diesel engines originally designed by  but now owned by PSA Peugeot Citroën:
 XD75
 XD80 — 1.6 L (1,608 cc)
 XD85 — 1.8 L (1,816 cc)
 XD88 — 1.9 L (1,948 cc)
 XD90 — 2.1 L (2,112 cc)
 XD2 — 2.3 L (2,304 cc)
 XD2S — 2.3 L (2,304 cc), turbocharged
 XD3 — 2.5 L (2,498 cc)
 XD3T — 2.5 L (2,498 cc), turbocharged
 XD3TE — 2.5 L (2,498 cc), turbocharged with intercooler

Applications:

Peugeot 403
Peugeot 404
Peugeot 405
Peugeot 504
Peugeot 505
Talbot Tagora 2.3 DT
Peugeot 604
Peugeot P4
Peugeot J7
Peugeot 605
Ford Granada Mk2
Ford Sierra Mk1 2.3 D
GAZ-24 Volga (export version)
UAZ-469/469B (Italian export version)

A small number of these engines were also fitted into Leyland vans.

XK/XL/XR

The XK was an all-new family of inline-four petrol and diesel engines developed for Peugeot's new 204, their first front-wheel drive car. The engine is made from aluminium and has removable cylinder liners. The engine had a distinctive design; the gearbox and differential were located directly below the engine block. This design helped Peugeot produce its first front-wheel-drive car. The original XK had an 1,130 cc displacement; later the 1.3 liter XL engine appeared and then the 1.5 liter XR series which was developed specifically for the 305. There were also diesel engines developed; the 1,255 cc XLD and the 1,357 cc XL4D. In 1979 the XID appeared, with 1,548 cc this version shared many parts with the XR petrol engine.

Both the original XK and the larger XL underwent major changes around the end of 1975, receiving shorter strokes and wider bores which ended up resulting in nearly the same displacement and with very similar outputs, albeit with lower torque.

 XK — 1.1 L (1,130 cc), Peugeot 204, 1965-1969
 XK4 — 1.1 L (1,130 cc), Peugeot 204, 1969-1976
 XK5 — 1.1 L (1,127 cc), Peugeot 204 and 304 GL Break/Fourgonette, 1975-1980
 XL3 — 1.3 L (1,288 cc), Peugeot 304, 1969-1976
 XL3S — 1.3 L (1,288 cc) twin carbs, Peugeot 304 S (1972-1976) and Abarth Simca 1300 GT (1962-1965), 
 XL5 — 1.3 L (1,290 cc), Peugeot 304 and 305, 1976-1986
 XL5S — 1.3 L (1,290 cc) twin carbs, Peugeot 304 SLS, 1976-1978
 XR5 — 1.5 L (1,472 cc), Peugeot 305, 1977-1983
 XR5S — 1.5 L (1,472 cc) twin carbs, Peugeot 305 S, 1980-1982
 XLD — 1.25 L (1,255 cc) diesel, Peugeot 204 Break/Fourgonette, 1968-1973
 XL4D — 1.4 L (1,357 cc) diesel, Peugeot 204 and 304, 1973-1979
 XID/XIDL — 1.55 L (1,548 cc) diesel, Peugeot 304 and 305, 1979-1982

XM

The XM was a family of inline-four petrol engines produced from 1968 to 1990. These engines had an OHV design valvetrain, with two valves per cylinder. Bore and stroke were 84 mm and 81 mm, respectively. They were carbureted and later were offered with mechanical fuel injection. The versions available were:

 XM — 1.8 L (1,796 cc)
 XMKF5 — 1.8 L (1,796 cc)
 XMKF6 — 1.8 L (1,796 cc)
 XM7 — 1.8 L (1,796 cc)
 XM7A — 1.8 L (1,796 cc)
 XM7P — 1.8 L (1,796 cc)
 XM7T — 1.8 L (1,796 cc)

The XM engines were used in the Peugeot 504 and Peugeot 505, as well as the Peugeot J7 and Peugeot J5 vans. The XM7 was also fitted to South African-assembled Peugeot 404.

XN

The XN was a family of inline-four petrol engines closely related to the smaller XM-series, used mainly in the Peugeot 504 and 505 family cars but in certain other vehicles as well. These engines have an OHV design valvetrain, with two valves per cylinder. Bore and stroke are 88 mm and 81 mm, respectively.:
 XN1 — 2.0 L (1,971 cc). Carburetor engine.
 XN2 — 2.0 L (1,971 cc). Equipped with Kugelfischer mechanical fuel injection, the XN2 was fitted to 504 TI and 504 Coupé/Cabriolets.
 XN6 — 2.0 L (1,971 cc). In Europe, this was only fitted to the four-cylinder 604 SR, a car only sold to French governmental agencies. The XN6 was also used in North American market 504s and 505s between model years 1980 and 1987.

XU

The XU is a family of inline-four petrol engines:
 XU5 — 1.6 L (1580 cc)
 XU7 — 1.8 L (1761 cc)
 XU8 — 1.8 L (1775 cc)
 XU9 — 1.9 L (1905 cc)
 XU10 — 2.0 L (1998 cc)

XUD

The XUD is a family of inline-four diesel engines:
 XUD7 — 1.8 L (1,769 cc)
 XUD9 — 1.9 L (1,905 cc)
 XUD11 — 2.1 L (2,088 cc) or 2.1 L (2,138 cc)

References

Guide des moteurs Peugeot Citroën (in French)
Peugeot Model & Engine Types

PSA|